Oldenburg is a town in Ray Township, Franklin County, Indiana, United States. The population was 674 at the 2010 census.

Geography
Oldenburg is located at  (39.339474, -85.204640).

History

Oldenburg was founded in 1837 by a group of German settlers. The town was named after Oldenburg, in Germany. Incorporated in 1881, Oldenburg is called the "Village of Spires" because of its churches and religious educational institutions. In 1851, Mother Theresa Hackelmeier (1827-1860) founded the Sisters of St. Francis of Oldenburg who would open numerous schools in the Midwest.

The Oldenburg Historic District was listed on the National Register of Historic Places in 1983.

Demographics

2010 census
As of the census of 2010, there were 674 people, 235 households, and 156 families living in the town. The racial makeup of the town was 98.5% White, 0.1% African American, 0.6% from other races, and 0.7% from two or more races. Hispanic or Latino of any race were 1.9% of the population.

There were 235 households, of which 30.6% had children under the age of 18 living with them, 52.3% were married couples living together, 10.6% had a female householder with no husband present, 3.4% had a male householder with no wife present, and 33.6% were non-families. 29.4% of all households were made up of individuals, and 14.9% had someone living alone who was 65 years of age or older. The average household size was 2.39 and the average family size was 2.97.

The median age in the town was 51 years. 20.6% of residents were under the age of 18; 5.8% were between the ages of 18 and 24; 17.3% were from 25 to 44; 26.7% were from 45 to 64; and 29.5% were 65 years of age or older. The gender makeup of the town was 39.3% male and 60.7% female.

2000 census
As of the census of 2000, there were 647 people, 215 households, and 135 families living in the town. The racial makeup of the town was 98.92% White, 0.46% Asian, and 0.62% from two or more races. Hispanic or Latino of any race were 0.15% of the population.

There were 215 households, out of which 27.4% had children under the age of 18 living with them, 54.4% were married couples living together, 7.0% had a female householder with no husband present, and 37.2% were non-families. 34.4% of all households were made up of individuals, and 19.5% had someone living alone who was 65 years of age or older. The average household size was 2.31 and the average family size was 3.01.

In the town, the population was spread out, with 17.3% under the age of 18, 5.1% from 18 to 24, 21.2% from 25 to 44, 21.8% from 45 to 64, and 34.6% who were 65 years of age or older. The median age was 49 years. For every 100 females, there were 63.0 males. For every 100 females age 18 and over, there were 55.5 males.

The median income for a household in the town was $42,292, and the median income for a family was $56,042. Males had a median income of $36,635 versus $28,571 for females. The per capita income for the town was $19,620. About 2.3% of families and 17.7% of the population were below the poverty line, including 1.8% of those under age 18 and 41.6% of those age 65 or over.

Notable natives of Oldenburg
 John Henry Tihen (1861–1940) American prelate of the Roman Catholic Church

References

External links
 Official Freudenfest Website

German-American history
Towns in Franklin County, Indiana
Towns in Indiana
1837 establishments in Indiana